Old If Not Wild is the fifth studio album by Chinese singer Li Yuchun, released on September 4, 2012 by EE Media.

Track listing

Music videos
Burning Life 似火年华
Hello Baby
Old If Not Wild 再不疯狂我们就老了
Deaf 聋子

References

2012 albums
Chinese-language albums
Li Yuchun albums